Nong Loeng is a tambon (subdistrict) of Mueang Bueng Kan District, in Bueng Kan Province, Thailand. In 2020 it had a total population of 8,752 people.

History
The subdistrict was created effective June 26, 1975 by splitting off 6 administrative villages from Nong Kheng.

Administration

Central administration
The tambon is subdivided into 13 administrative villages (muban).

Local administration
The whole area of the subdistrict is covered by the subdistrict municipality (Thesaban Tambon) Nong Loeng (เทศบาลตำบลหนองเลิง).

References

External links
Thaitambon.com on Nong Loeng

Tambon of Bueng Kan province
Populated places in Bueng Kan province
Mueang Bueng Kan District